Sham Tsz Kit v Secretary for Justice FACV 14/2022 is a forthcoming Hong Kong Court of Final Appeal case concerning whether same-sex couples have a constitutionally guaranteed right to marry or, alternatively, the right to form civil partnerships or the right to have foreign same-sex marriages recognised. A hearing date has yet to be scheduled. The Court of First Instance and the Court of Appeal dismissed the judicial review.

Background 
Jimmy Sham Tsz-kit is a Hong Kong permanent resident and a political activist presently jailed for alleged subversion under the National Security Law. He is gay, and has had a stable same-sex partner since 2011, who is also a Hong Kong permanent resident. Because Hong Kong law does not permit same-sex marriages or civil partnerships, Sham married his partner in New York.

Court of Final Appeal 
On 10 November 2022, the Court of Appeal granted permission to appeal to the Court of Final Appeal on the following certified questions of law:

 Does the exclusion of same-sex couples from the institution of marriage constitute a violation of the right to equality enshrined in Article 22 of the Bill of Rights ("BOR22") and Article 25 of the Basic Law ("BL25")?
 Do the laws of Hong Kong, insofar as they do not allow same-sex marriage or provide any alternative means of legal recognition of same-sex partnerships, constitute a violation of the right to privacy under BOR14 and/or the right to equality enshrined in BOR22 and BL25?
 Do the laws of Hong Kong, insofar as they do not recognise foreign same-sex marriage, constitute a violation of the right to equality enshrined in BOR22 and BL25?

Court of Appeal 
The Court of Appeal held:

Right to marry 
BL37 provides that the freedom of marriage of Hong Kong residents and their right to raise a family freely shall be protected by law. On a purposive interpretation, the historical context supports the interpretation that BL37 only extends to heterosexual marriages. Although the Court accepted that fundamental rights should be generously interpreted, a proper interpretation requires these fundamental rights to be read together with other provisions of BL as a coherent whole. Lex specialis prevails over lex generalis.

BL37 is the lex specialis on the right to marry and prefers heterosexual marriage, whereas BL25, BOR22, and BOR14 are general provisions which do not specify a right to marry. Therefore, BL25, BOR22, and BOR14 are not engaged and the question of justification did not arise.

Civil partnerships 
On a proper interpretation, BOR14 does not impose a duty to recognise civil partnerships, locally or overseas.

See also 

 LGBT rights in Hong Kong
 Recognition of same-sex unions in Hong Kong

References 

LGBT rights
LGBT rights in Hong Kong
LGBT rights case law